The 2009 NZIHL season was the fifth season of the New Zealand Ice Hockey League, the top level of ice hockey in New Zealand. Five teams participated in the league, and the Canterbury Red Devils won the championship by defeating the Southern Stampede in the final.

Regular season

Final 
 Canterbury Red Devils – Southern Stampede 5:4

External links 
 New Zealand Ice Hockey League official site

Seasons in New Zealand ice hockey
New Zealand Ice Hockey League seasons
Ice
New